Guo Weiyang (born February 1, 1988) is a Chinese gymnast. He competed for the national team at the 2012 Summer Olympics in the Men's artistic team all-around, where they won the gold medal.

See also
 China at the 2012 Summer Olympics

References

Chinese male artistic gymnasts
Olympic gymnasts of China
Olympic gold medalists for China
Olympic medalists in gymnastics
Gymnasts at the 2012 Summer Olympics
Medalists at the 2012 Summer Olympics
Gymnasts from Yunnan
People from Yuxi
1988 births
Living people
Chaoshanese people
21st-century Chinese people